GKB may refer to:
Good Karma Brands, an American radio broadcaster
Graubündner Kantonalbank, a Swiss cantonal bank
GKB Associates, founded by Greta Berlin
Union of Young Communists, the youth wing of the Revolutionary Communist Party of Turkey